Entrada Mayer Airport  is an airport near Entrada Mayer (es), a small frontier settlement in the Aysén Region of Chile.

There is mountainous terrain in all quadrants except southeast, down the valley of the Mayer River into Argentina.

See also

Transport in Chile
List of airports in Chile

References

External links
OpenStreetMap - Entrada Mayer
OurAirports - Entrada Mayer
SkyVector - Entrada Mayer
FallingRain - Entrada Mayer Airport

Airports in Aysén Region